The 1943 Philadelphia mayoral election saw the reelection of Bernard Samuel, who had taken office after the death of Robert Eneas Lamberton.

Results

References

1943
Philadelphia
1943 Pennsylvania elections
1940s in Philadelphia